Followin' a Feelin' is the third studio album by Australian country music artist Sherrié Austin. It was released in 2001 by WE Records and peaked at No. 43 on the Billboard Top Country Albums chart. The album's only charted single was a cover of Dolly Parton's "Jolene". Austin's version of the song reached No. 55 on the Hot Country Songs charts in July 2001.

Critical reception
Maria Konicki Dinoia of Allmusic gave the album 4 out of 5 stars, saying that "She's evolved into an exceptionally strong songwriter, having written or co-written nine of the album's ten virtually flawless tracks."

Track listing
"Followin' a Feelin'" (Sherrié Austin, Rob Crosby, Will Rambeaux) — 3:19
"Jolene" (Dolly Parton) — 3:17
"Goin' Goin' Gone" (Austin, Rambeaux, Jon Christopher Davis) — 4:14
"Somethin' Missin' in the Kissin'" (Austin, Rambeaux, Blair Daly) — 3:21
"In the Meantime" (Austin, Rambeaux, Crosby) — 3:41
"My Brilliant Mistake" (Austin, Rambeaux, Greg Barnhill) — 3:17
"In Our Own Sweet Time" (Austin, Rambeaux, Marcus Hummon) — 3:07
"Love Melts Even the Coldest Hearts" (Austin, Shawna Harrington-Burkhart) — 3:17
"Back Where I Belong" (Austin, Rambeaux, Kimberly Roads, Philip Sweet) — 3:00
"Time, Love and Money" (Austin, Rambeaux, Dave Berg) — 3:11

Personnel
 Stephanie Bentley - backing vocals
 Pat Buchanan - electric guitar
 J. T. Corenflos - electric guitar
 Jon Christopher Davis - backing vocals
 Larry Franklin - mandolin, fiddle
 Jimmy Hull - harmonica
 Mike Joyce - bass
 Troy Lancaster - electric guitar
 Tim Lauer - keyboards
 Gary McIntyre - steel guitar
 Russ Pahl - steel guitar
 Kim Parent - backing vocals
 Paul Scholten - drums
 Steven Sheehan - acoustic guitar
 Barry Walsh - keyboards

Chart performance

References

2001 albums
Sherrié Austin albums